Waryn is a surname. Notable people with the surname include:

Henry Waryn, MP for Huntingdonshire
John Waryn, 15th century archdeacon
William Waryn, MP for Salisbury

See also
Warren (disambiguation)